The  (c. 340 BC–700 AD), also referred to as the Epi-Jōmon period, is the time in Japanese prehistory that saw the flourishing of the Zoku-Jōmon culture, a continuation of Jōmon culture in northern Tōhoku and Hokkaidō that corresponds with the Yayoi period and Kofun period elsewhere. Zoku-Jōmon ("continuing cord-marking") in turn gave way to Satsumon ("brushed pattern" or "scraped design") around the seventh century or in the Nara period (710–794). The "Yayoinisation" of northeast Honshū took place in the mid-Yayoi period; use of the term Zoku-Jōmon is then confined to those, in Hokkaidō, who did not "become Yayoi". Despite the elements of continuity emphasised by the name, which include the continuing production of cord-marked ceramics, ongoing employment of stone technology, and non-transition to rice-based agriculture, all Jōmon hallmarks, the Zoku-Jōmon period nevertheless saw a "major break in mobility and subsistence patterns".

See also
 History of Japan
 Okhotsk culture

References

Japanese eras
Ancient Japan
History of Hokkaido
Archaeological cultures of East Asia
Archaeology of Japan
7th century
6th century
5th century
4th century
3rd century
2nd century
1st century
1st century BC
2nd century BC
3rd century BC
4th century BC